Rudy Rinaldi (born 18 August 1993) is a Monegasque bobsledder. He competed in the two-man event at the 2018 Winter Olympics. In January 2022, Rinaldi qualified to compete for Monaco at the 2022 Winter Olympics in the two-man bob event.

il mît un terme à sa carrière professionnelle après une dernière descente, en tant qu’ouvreurs pour les championnats de France accompagné de ses amis Antonin Vial et Rémi Germain de Montauzan.

References

External links
 

1993 births
Living people
Monegasque male bobsledders
Olympic bobsledders of Monaco
Bobsledders at the 2018 Winter Olympics
Bobsledders at the 2022 Winter Olympics
Place of birth missing (living people)
Bobsledders at the 2012 Winter Youth Olympics